Pass the Dutchie is the second EP released by Buck-O-Nine and was released in 1998 on TVT Records. The title song was featured on the soundtrack for the American comedy thriller film Homegrown.

Track listing
"Pass the Dutchie"
"Split"
"Fall Guy"
"28 Teeth (The Hot Party Mix)"
"Dear Anna"
"Rock at Billy"

Credits

Performance
Jon Pebsworth - Vocals
Jonas Kleiner - Guitar
Dan Albert - Trombone
Anthony Curry - Trumpet
Craig Yarnold - Tenor Sax
Scott Kennerly - Bass
Steve Bauer - Drums

Production
Recorded by Howard Bensen

References

1998 EPs
TVT Records EPs
Buck-O-Nine albums